The men's 60 kg competition at the 2017 European Judo Championships in Warsaw was held on 20 April at the Torwar Hall.

Results

Finals

Repechages

Pool A

Pool B

Pool C

Pool D

References

External links
 
 Judo - Men's 60 kg

M60
European Judo Championships Men's Extra Lightweight